South Dakota Highway 46 is a  state highway in South Dakota, United States, that runs west to east across the southeastern part of the state. It begins at the junction of U.S. Highway 18 and U.S. Highway 281 in Pickstown, and runs due east to nearly the Iowa border, before curving south to cross the border and meeting Iowa Highway 10.

Route description

History
South Dakota 46 was established around 1935.  Its initial alignment only extended west to U.S. Highway 81.  The extension further west occurred around 1960.

Major intersections

See also

 List of state highways in South Dakota

References

External links

 South Dakota Highways Page: Highways 31-60

046
Transportation in Charles Mix County, South Dakota
Transportation in Bon Homme County, South Dakota
Transportation in Yankton County, South Dakota
Transportation in Clay County, South Dakota
Transportation in Turner County, South Dakota
Transportation in Union County, South Dakota
Transportation in Lincoln County, South Dakota